Max Ferrari may refer:

 Max Ferrari (politician) (born 1971), Italian politician and journalist
 Max Ferrari (soccer) (born 2000), Canadian soccer player